The  (lit. East Kantō Expressway) is a national expressway in Japan. It is owned and operated by East Nippon Expressway Company.

Overview 
Officially the expressway is referred to as the Higashi-Kantō Expressway Mito Route.

The expressway commences at a junction with the Shuto Expressway Bayshore Route in western Chiba Prefecture and follows an easterly course which parallels Tokyo Bay. Just before Miyanogi Junction where the expressway meets the Keiyō Road, the route branches away from the bay and heads inland in a northeasterly direction. It continues through Chiba Prefecture, though the city of Narita, and crossing the Tone River into Ibaraki Prefecture where the expressway reaches its current terminus in Itako.

The expressway is an important route linking the greater Tokyo area with Narita International Airport. At Narita Junction travellers must switch to the Shin-Kūkō Expressway to travel the remaining distance to the airport proper.

Currently the expressway extends from Wangan-Ichikawa Interchange to Itako Interchange, however plans are underway to extend the expressway to a junction with the Kita-Kantō Expressway near Mito, Ibaraki.

The expressway is 6 lanes from the origin to Narita Junction, and the remainder is 4 lanes.

List of interchanges and features 
 IC - interchange, JCT - junction, PA - parking area, SA - service area, BR - bridge, TB - toll gate

References

External links 

 East Nippon Expressway Company

Expressways in Japan
Roads in Chiba Prefecture
Roads in Ibaraki Prefecture
Proposed roads in Japan